Hoku (Hoku Ho Clements, born 1981) is an American singer.

Hoku may also refer to:
 Hoku (album), a 2000 album by Hoku
 Hoku Awards, or Na Hoku Hanohano Awards, a music award in Hawaii
 Hoku Garza, Hawaiian reggae musician

See also
 
 
 Hocus Pocus (disambiguation)
 Griever de Hocus, a character from Griever: An American Monkey King in China
 Sir Hokus of Pokes, a character from Oz